DWO or Dwo may refer to:

 Doctor Who Online
 Dynasty Warriors Online
 Dwo, a deity worshipped by the Bwa people